Jean-Baptiste Minne-Barth (2 September 1796 – 17 February 1851) was a lawyer and Belgian Orangist politician.

He was a municipality Council member (1830–1841) and burgomaster of Ghent (1837–1840). Jean-Baptiste Minne-Barth became President of the University of Ghent in 1846.

Sources
 Jean-Baptiste Minne-Barth (Liberal archive)

1796 births
1851 deaths

19th-century Belgian lawyers
Mayors of Ghent